Sketchfab is a  3D modeling platform website to publish, share, discover, buy and sell 3D, VR and AR content. It provides a viewer based on the WebGL and WebXR technologies that allows users to display 3D models on the web, to be viewed on any mobile browser, desktop browser or Virtual Reality headset.

The company behind it is today based in Paris and New York City. Sketchfab took part in the Spring 2013 TechStars New York City startup accelerator program, raised $2 million in December 2013 and $7 million in June 2015.

On July 21, 2021, Epic Games acquired Sketchfab.

Service

Viewer 
The main product of Sketchfab is a 3D, Virtual reality (VR) and Augmented reality (AR) model viewer. It enables users to move freely around or inside the 3D scene using mouse, touch manipulation, VR or AR. In addition to static 3D models, the viewer is able to play and control 3D animations. Viewers can enable the VR mode to see the model in Virtual Reality headsets or the AR mode to insert the model within the real world via a mobile device.

The 3D viewer is used on the Sketchfab website and mobile apps, but can also be embedded on external websites, notably on Facebook, Twitter or Wordpress.

Portal and marketplace 
Sketchfab provides online and mobile community portals, where visitors can browse, rate, download or buy user generated 3D models.

Users of Sketchfab have profile pages, premium users can customize and share their models privately. Sketchfab users can choose to make their 3D model files available for download under Creative Commons licenses or to sell them in the Sketchfab store. With content available for sale or download, Sketchfab is positioned as a 3D model marketplace and as a 3D printing marketplace since some models are compatible with 3D printing.

3D asset management 
Sketchfab offers to paying enterprise customers a dedicated platform to share, manage and collaborate on 3D assets.

Native applications 
A selection of Sketchfab models are available within a native application for the following VR headsets: Google Cardboard, Samsung Gear VR, HTC Vive and Oculus Rift.

The mobile application can be used to view the 3D models in Augmented Reality leveraging the ARKit APIs on iOS and ARCore on Android.

Model upload and download 
3D models can be uploaded to Sketchfab from its website or directly from various 3D software, using plugins (for example for 3ds Max or SketchUp) or natively (from Blender or Adobe Photoshop).

Sketchfab offers an API allowing developers to integrate functionality for searching and downloading Sketchfab's Creative Commons licensed 3D models into their applications.

Technology 

Sketchfab relies on the WebGL JavaScript API to display 3D on web pages in all major modern web browsers. It does not rely on third-party plugins.

Sketchfab implements the WebVR JavaScript API to provide a Virtual Reality mode of its viewer on compatible VR headsets.

The 3D viewer uses the open-source OSG.JS JavaScript library, a library created and largely maintained by Sketchfab employees. Rendering is achieved using classic real-time rendering or physically based rendering.

Company 

Sketchfab was initially created by entrepreneur and 3D developer Cédric Pinson under the domain name ShowWebGL in early 2011.
He was joined in early 2012 by Alban Denoyel, and they relaunched the site under the name Sketchfab in March 2012. Pierre-Antoine Passet joined as CPO in September 2012.

Startup accelerators

The startup was part of the third batch of the French startup accelerator Le Camping in June 2012. It was later selected into Mozilla's WebFWD accelerator program during that same year.
The year after, Sketchfab was selected in the Spring 2013 TechStars class in New York City.

Fundraising
In February 2013, Sketchfab raised an angel round of 370,000 euros.
Less than one year after, in December 2013, Sketchfab raised $2 million from Balderton Capital with Partech Ventures, Borealis Ventures, David Cohen and existing angel investors also participated in the funding. In June 2015, Sketchfab raised a $7 million Series A led by FirstMark Capital. In December 2018, Brendan Iribe, the original CEO and co-founder of Oculus invested in Sketchfab.

Awards 
 Top 8 at Pioneers Festival 2012
 Best “Lightweight” Startup, the Europas Awards 2013

See also 
 3D printing marketplace

References 

3D graphics software
Free 3D graphics software
Online marketplaces of France
Internet properties established in 2012
WebGL
3D graphics art
2021 mergers and acquisitions
Epic Games